You and I (German: Du und ich) is a 1938 German romance film directed by Wolfgang Liebeneiner and starring Brigitte Horney, Joachim Gottschalk and Paul Bildt.

Cast

References

Bibliography 
 Hake, Sabine. Popular Cinema of the Third Reich. University of Texas Press, 2001.

External links 
 

1938 films
German romance films
1930s romance films
1930s German-language films
Films directed by Wolfgang Liebeneiner
Films of Nazi Germany
Terra Film films
German black-and-white films
1930s German films